Jamo bey Hajinski Suleyman oghlu (1888 – 1942) was an Azerbaijani publicist, public figure and politician. He served in the first, fourth and fifth cabinets of Azerbaijan Democratic Republic as its State Controller and Minister of Postal Service and Telegraph.

Early life and career
Hajinsky was born in Quba on June 14, 1888. In 1912, he graduated from Law Department of Petersburg University. Upon his return to Azerbaijan, he became a member of Muslim fraction of Transcaucasian Sejm. He was one of noble figures who played a role in the development of Azerbaijani art.
Along with his relative Mammad Hasan Hajinski, he was one of the co-signers of Proclamation of Independence of Azerbaijan Democratic Republic. Jamo bey Hajinski's affiliation was with Muslim Socialist Bloc. Once the Transcaucasian Republic dissolved, Jamo bey Hajinski was elected to the Presidium of Azerbaijani National Council, an Azerbaijani governing body which would establish sovereignty in Azerbaijan.

After the establishment of the Azerbaijan Democratic Republic on May 28, 1918, he served as the State Controller in Fatali Khan Khoyski's newly formed first government, and as the Minister of Transportation, Postal Service and Telegraph in Nasib Yusifbeyli's fourth and fifth governments.

Later years and death
After Bolshevik invasion of Azerbaijan on April 28, 1920, he worked in the education sector until his arrest in 1922 by Soviet authorities. He was held in prison for 3 years and then sent to Solovki prison camp in Russia. Even though he was released in 1928 and returned to Baku, Hajinski was arrested anew in 1938 and sent to Vyatka prison camp in Kirov Oblast of Russia where he died in 1942. In 1956, after his death, he was declared not guilty of any crime.

See also
Azerbaijani National Council

References

1888 births
1942 deaths
Azerbaijani Muslims
People from Quba
People from Baku Governorate
Azerbaijan Democratic Republic politicians
Government ministers of Azerbaijan
Azerbaijani socialists
Soviet rehabilitations
Members of the National Assembly of the Azerbaijan Democratic Republic